The term free body is usually associated with the motion of a free body diagram, a pictorial device used by physicists and engineers. In that context, a body is said to be "free" when it is singled out from other bodies for the purposes of dynamic or static analysis. The object does not have to be "free" in the sense of being unforced, and it may or may not be in a state of equilibrium; rather, it is not fixed in place and is thus "free" to move in response to forces and torques it may experience.

Example 

Figure 1 shows, on the left, green, red, and blue widgets stacked on top of each other, and for some reason the red cylinder happens to be the body of interest. (It may be necessary to calculate the stress to which it is subjected, for example.) On the right, the red cylinder has become the free body. In figure 2, the interest has shifted to just the left half of the red cylinder and so now it is the free body on the right. The example illustrates the context sensitivity of the term "free body". A cylinder can be part of a free body, it can be a free body by itself, and, as it is composed of parts, any of those parts may be a free body in itself.

Note that figure 1 and 2 are not yet free body diagrams. In a completed free body diagram, the free body would be shown with forces acting on it.

Freely falling body 

A free body should also be distinguished from a freely falling body. In Newtonian physics, the latter term refers to a body which is falling under pure gravity with all other forces being zero. In Einstein's general theory of relativity, where gravity becomes curvature of spacetime, a freely falling body is subject to no forces whatsoever and is a body moving along a geodesic. A free body in the context of this article may not be following a geodesic and may be subject to all sorts of forces, gravitational and other.

See also
Free body diagram

References 

Classical mechanics